Ignacy Karol Korwin-Milewski (Lithuanian: Ignotas Karolis Korvin–Milevskis; 27 April 1846 – 16 October 1926) was a Polish-Lithuanian art collector, political writer and traveler.

Biography 
Korwin-Milewski was born into a landowning, noble family. His parents were Oskar Korwin-Milewski and Weronika née Wołk-Łaniewska. His older brother was Hipolit Korwin-Milewski. In 1856–1863, he lived in Paris where he studied at Lycée Bonaparte. He continued his studies of law at the University of Dorpat in 1865–1868. There he belonged to the student corporation "Polonia", but maintained contacts mainly with the Baltic German nobility. In 1870–1875, he studied painting in Munich, where he found himself in the circle of Polish artists. He himself was not a talented painter, although he took part in the Paris Salon in 1874, where he exhibited a portrait of Maria Kwilecka née Mańkowska. He quickly gave up painting.

In the winter of 1875, he went to Rome, where he was made a Knight of Malta and received from the papal chancellery the title of Count for himself, his father and brother. His brother and father, however, did not accept the title, often signing themselves as "not a count". He also augmentated his Ślepowron coat of arms, and called the new coat of arms "Milan". 

In 1877, he took over his mother's large estate, which gave him financial independence and allowed him to live the life of an art collector and philanthropist. In Vilnius he built a residence for himself on St. George Street (present-day Gediminas Avenue).

He was friends with Archduke Charles Stephen of Austria, from whom he bought the steam yacht "Christa" and, after renaming it "Litwa", made long-distance voyages for 20 years, which he described in semi-anonymous publications. In 1900, together with the Archduke he travelled from Kiel to San Sebastian and Almeria to visit the Spanish Queen Maria Christina. In 1905, he bought from the Archduke the exterritorial island of  near Istria, where he intended to establish a luxury spa and sanatorium. The outbreak of war prevented him from realizing these intentions.

In 1922, he suffered a stroke that largely incapacitated him. He spent the rest of his life on his island. He died on 16 October 1926 in Pula and was buried in the cemetery in Rovigno d'Istria.

Family and personal life 
His brother Hipolit Korwin-Milewski was active in politics and patronage of the arts. Both brothers did not like each other, and in the later period were even hostile to each other.  After 1905, he married Janina Zofia Ostroróg Sadowska, the widow of Władysław Umiastowski, who was a patron of science and the founder of the J. Z. Umiastowska Roman Foundation in 1944. Their marriage was childless, the spouses were living apart. After a stroke, Korwin-Milewski publicly insulted his wife, who began to pursue him in court.

Art collection and patronage 

Korwin-Milewski has been collecting art all his life. Especially in 1880–1895 when he collected over 200 works. According to Milewski, Polish national characteristics came to the surface in certain historical periods, and this is what happened in relation to Polish painting of the late 19th century. At the same time he considered the French influence to be disastrous, so he defined the scope of his collecting as follows: "wishing to have a collection more or less complete and constituting an original whole (...) I acquire paintings of the fellow-countrymen artists, currently living, and among them only those who belong or belonged to the Munich school". Later he relaxed these criteria and collected paintings also from outside the Munich school. Art historian Andrzej Ryszkiewicz described his collection as "one of the most consciously collected, most valuable and most beautiful of the Polish paintings collections". His collection included paintings of:

Korwin-Milewski commissioned a set of about 20 self-portraits from various Polish artists, which were also included in the collection. In creating his collection of self-portraits, Milewski modelled it on a similar one held at the Uffizi in Florence.

Korwin-Milewski planned to build a gallery building in which he would make his collection accessible to the public, but was unable to reach an agreement with the authorities in Kraków and Lviv. Until 1893, the paintings were located in Vienna, then in Lviv and again in Vienna. In 1897, they were moved to the family estate in Hieraniony, then to Santa Caterina Island. In 1915, they were returned to Vienna. After the First World War the collection dispersed. This was connected with Ignacy Milewski's financial problems related to numerous lawsuits, so he was forced to sell his collection. Some of the works were bought by the National Museum in Warsaw (gallery of self-portraits and Stańczyk), some were found in private collections around the world. Several paintings was bought by the lawyer Emil Merwin, who represented Milewski in Vienna. They became the basis of his own collection of Polish paintings. Merwin's collection was found in the USA in 1968, but attempts to bring it back to Poland were unsuccessful. The entire collection was purchased by a Viennese antiquarian, Czesław Bednarczyk, who then sold the paintings to private buyers. A significant part of the collection was bought from Milewski by the Warsaw antiquarian Abe Gutnajer, who donated some of the paintings to the National Museum. Gutnajer ran two antique shops in Warsaw. One of them, at 16 Mazowiecka Street, was completely burnt down by a German bomb in September 1939. The other, at number 11 on Mazowiecka Street, was looted by the Germans during the occupation. To this day, the fate of most of the works from Gutnajer's collection is unknown.

Today a large part of Milewski's collection is held by the National Museum in Warsaw.

He also supported artists with his wealth. From 1888, he paid a salary and financed Aleksander Gierymski's trip to Paris. He also founded a studio for Wincenty Wodzinowski in Swoszowice.

Political views 
Korwin-Milewski was conservative, representing a loyalist stance, and as an eccentric person, he manifested his political views in ways that shocked those around him. He felt he was a representative of the nobility of the Grand Duchy of Lithuania. He believed that the nobility should play a leading role, as opposed to democratic ideals, and criticised the emancipation reform of 1861. He believed that an agreement between the nobility and the people of the Lithuanian and Belarusian lands ("Belarusians Russians", Lithuanians and Jews) was impossible because they and the tsarist government were opposed to it. He believed that the Lithuanian nobility should be loyal to the Tsar, who in return would repay them by giving them a leading role in society, as he put it, composed of "a couple of million compact masses of Lithuanians and Samogitians", "Russified Belarusians" and "incalculable crowds of Jews".

He believed that the Lithuanian nobility was and should be separated from the nobility in the Crown of the Polish Kingdom. He acknowledged that the culture of the Lithuanian nobility was based on the principle of the reign of "absolute Polishness", but stressed that earlier it had based its development on the Ruthenian language and culture. He acknowledged that the special social conditions prevailing in the lands of the Grand Duchy of Lithuania demanded that the Lithuanian nobility discover its own identity as the only means of maintaining the integrity of these lands:

He was an enemy of "Polish demagogy", i.e. the Polish national democratic movement. He blamed the Polish national movement for two unsuccessful uprisings in 1830–1831 and 1863–1864 that depleted the nobility's property in Lithuania, so that "the outer Polish shell is disappearing" and the masses of the rural population are growing in strength. The solution for him was a full merger with the Russian nobility, as did it the German nobility in Livonia or the Georgian nobility. 

Korwin-Milewski believed at the same time that the growing revolutionary movement was a favourable phenomenon, as it would inevitably face defeat and the revenge of Russian reaction. The Tsar would seek allies among conservative elements, such as the Lithuanian nobility.

List of publications 
 Introduction to Katolog der Ausstellung im Künstlerhause. Graflish I. Milewski'sche Sammlung, Vienna 1895
 Vingt-trois jours dans l'Ocean Glacial et la Mer Blanche. 4éme Croisiére de la Litwa, Paris 1898
 Une petite croisière en très haute compagnie, Paris 1899
 Sa Majesté la Reine d'Espagne et son Frère Mgr l'Archiduc Charles-Étienne, Paris 1901
 List otwarty do panów akcyonaryuszów Wileńskiego Ziemskiego Banku, Kraków 1884
 Eine Antwort des Grafen J. Milewski dem Krakauer Einwohner Karol Wlodzimirski als Zuhälter seiner eigenen Frau erteilt, Paris 1904
 Внутренный кризись России и Народное Представительство, Vilnius 1905
 Głos szlachcica o wyborach posła do Rady Państwa, Vilnius 1910, Warsaw 1911 and Sankt Petersburg 1911 in Russian
 Wiązanka odpowiedzi szlachcica tudzież słowo o tem, do czego ma dążyć szlachta litewska, Warsaw 1910
 Do czego ma dążyć szlachta litewska?, Warsaw-Vilnius 1911 in Polish and Russian
 Борьба с ложью, Sankt Petersburg 1910 and Sankt Petersburg 1911 in Polish
 O reformie duchowieństwa na Litwie,, Warsaw 1911
 Жажду Справедливости для угнетённого литовского дворянства, Petersburg 1912 
 Ein Separatfrieden mit Russland? as Polish-Russian magnate Doktor A.-Z., Vienna 1915

References

Sources 
 
 
 
 

1846 births
1926 deaths
Polish art collectors
Lithuanian art collectors
Knights of Malta
University of Tartu alumni